Yesterday and Today is the self-titled debut studio album by American hard rock/heavy metal band Yesterday and Today, released in 1976 through London Records.

Track listing

Personnel
Dave Meniketti – lead guitar, lead (1-7, 9) and backing vocals
Joey Alves – rhythm guitar, backing vocals
Phil Kennemore – bass, backing and co-lead (1) vocals
Leonard Haze – drums, backing and lead (8) vocals

References

Y&T albums
London Records albums
1976 debut albums